Malcolm Francis Mallette  (January 30, 1922 in Syracuse, New York – November 25, 2005) was a pitcher in Major League Baseball. He pitched in two games for the Brooklyn Dodgers in 1950.

He worked as a sportswriter after retiring, becoming a director of the American Press Institute and was inducted into the N.C. Journalism Hall of Fame .

External links

Major League Baseball pitchers
Brooklyn Dodgers players
1922 births
2005 deaths
Baseball players from Syracuse, New York
Syracuse Orangemen baseball players
Norfolk Tars players
Newark Bears (IL) players
Kansas City Blues (baseball) players
Sacramento Solons players
Memphis Chickasaws players
Elmira Pioneers players
Montreal Royals players